Claire B. Lang is an American talk show host.  Since 1996, she has reported for NASCAR.  She is currently the host of XM Satellite Radio's "Dialed In." She was one of the first women to become a sports radio host. She has been called the "First Lady" of NASCAR Radio.

Beyond her work as a radio host, Lang has appeared on The John Boy & Billy Show, TBS, Fox Television, Inside NASCAR, and Sky Sports in Europe. She attended the University of Wisconsin-Eau Claire, graduating in 1976. She voices the narrator on all the main challenges in the 2017 video game NASCAR Heat 2.

Lang is the daughter of John Bennett, the silver medalist in long jump at the 1956 Summer Olympics.

References

Living people
American sports radio personalities
University of Wisconsin–Eau Claire alumni
American sports journalists
Year of birth missing (living people)